Starokulchubayevo (İśke Qolsobay) is a rural locality (a village) in Tynbayevsky Selsoviet, Mishkinsky District, Bashkortostan, Russia. The population was 400 as of 2010. There are 8 streets.

Geography 
Starokulchubayevo is located 47 km northwest of Mishkino (the district's administrative centre) by road. Tynbayevo is the nearest rural locality.

References 

Rural localities in Mishkinsky District